Wadi Abu Erouq is a wadi in southern Jordan.

References

Abu Erouq